Loch Sheldrake Synagogue is a historic synagogue on NY 52, north of the junction of NY 52 and Loch Sheldrake Road in Loch Sheldrake, Sullivan County, New York.  It was built between 1922 and 1930 of buff-colored brick on a concrete foundation, three bays wide and five bays deep. It is surmounted by a steep gable roof and features a projecting, stepped-gabled entrance pavilion with a limestone parapet.

It was added to the National Register of Historic Places in 1997.

The synagogue is open for daily prayer services in the Summer and prays according to the Ashkenazi custom.  The spiritual leader of the synagogue during the summer is Rabbi Rashi Shapiro.

References

Synagogues in Sullivan County, New York
National Register of Historic Places in Sullivan County, New York
Synagogues on the National Register of Historic Places in New York (state)
Synagogues completed in 1930
1930 establishments in New York (state)